William Henry Campbell (26 July 1883 – 9 July 1954) was an Australian rules footballer who played for the Fitzroy Football Club in the Victorian Football League (VFL).

Notes

External links 
		

1883 births
1954 deaths
Australian rules footballers from Melbourne
Fitzroy Football Club players
People from Warrandyte, Victoria